Post Oak is an unincorporated community in Blanco County, in the U.S. state of Texas. According to the Handbook of Texas, the community had a population of 10 in 2000.

History
The area in what is known as Post Oak today was first settled by Pinkney Hickson around 1874. He donated two acres of land to build a cemetery on. 15 families lived in the community in 1958 with an official population of 10 in 2000.

Geography

Education
Pinkney Hickson donated a half-acre of land for a school to be built on. It joined the Johnson City Independent School District in the late 1930s. The community continues to be served by Johnson City ISD today.

References

Unincorporated communities in Blanco County, Texas
Unincorporated communities in Texas